Schuyler County is the name of several counties in the United States, all of which named after Philip Schuyler:
 Schuyler County, Illinois
 Schuyler County, Missouri
 Schuyler County, New York